NIPS or Nips may refer to:

 Conference on Neural Information Processing Systems
 Network Intrusion Prevention System
 New Ideal Public School,  Mathura, India
 Nips, derogative word for Japanese people
 The Nips, punk band
 Northern Ireland Prison Service
 Non-Invasive Prenatal Screening, see Prenatal testing

See also
 NIP (disambiguation)